There were six independent candidates in the 2007 Manitoba provincial election, none of whom were elected.

One independent candidate, Conrad Santos, was formerly a Member of the Legislative Assembly with the New Democratic Party.  Information about the other candidates may be found here.

Candidates

Minnedosa: Colin George Atkins

Colin George Atkins was born in Leeds, England on June 24, 1931, and moved to Canada in 1952.  Now retired, he lives in Souris, Manitoba.  He has been a member of the Christian Heritage Party of Canada (CHP) since its formation in 1987, and was the president of its Manitoba division for three years.  (The CHP does not run candidates at the provincial level.)

References

Independent candidates in Manitoba provincial elections